The Maldives FA Cup is Maldives's premier knockout tournament in men's football (soccer). Champion team will advance to qualify for the next year of AFC Cup.

Previous winners
Previous winners are: 
1988 : Club Valencia               bt  New Radiant SC
1989 : New Radiant            bt  Victory Sports Club
1990 : Club Lagoons           bt  New Radiant SC
1991 : New Radiant           bt  Club Lagoons
1992 : Club Lagoons           bt  Club Valencia
1993 : Victory Sports Club            bt  Club Lagoons
1994 : New Radiant           bt  Club Valencia
1995 : Club Valencia           1-0 New Radiant SC
1996 : New Radiant           bt  Victory Sports Club
1997 : New Radiant           2-0 Club Valencia
1998 : New Radiant           1-0 Hurriyya SC
1999 : Club Valencia       2-2 2-1 New Radiant SC
2000 : Victory Sports Club           3-0 Hurriyya SC
2001 : New Radiant      1-1 2-0 Club Valencia
2002 : Island FC           2-0 New Radiant SC
2003 : Island FC           1-0 Club Valencia
2004 : Club Valencia           2-0 Victory Sports Club
2005 : New Radiant           2-0 Club Valencia
2006 : New Radiant           2-0 Club Valencia
2007 : New Radiant           2-0 Club Valencia
2008 : VB Sports Club              1-0 New Radiant SC
2009 : Victory Sports Club           2-0 VB Sports
2010 : Victory Sports Club           2-1 New Radiant SC
2011 : VB Sports Club 6-4 (aet) Maziya S&RC
2012 : Maziya S&RC 2-1 Club Eagles
2013 : New Radiant SC 1-0 Maziya S&RC
2014 : Maziya S&RC 0-0 New Radiant SC (aet, 4-3 pens)
2015 : not held
2016 : Club Valencia 3-1 TC Sports Club
2017 : New Radiant SC 2-2 TC Sports Club (aet, 4-2 pens)
2018 : not held
2019 : not held
2020 : cancelled and declared null and void due to COVID-19

Number of Titles
New Radiant SC (12)
Club Valencia (5)
Victory Sports Club (4)
VB Addu FC (4)*
Club Lagoons (2)
Maziya S&RC (2)

Note!
Island FC renamed as VB Sports Club and later changed as VB Addu FC.

See also
FA Cup - Mihaaru Sports

References

 
1
National association football cups